The PalaTupparello is an indoor venue in Acireale, Italy. It is the largest indoor sports facility in Sicily, as it can hold 8,000 spectators and is also used to host musical performances and concerts. The venue was used as a vaccination centre during the COVID-19 pandemic. The venue unsuccessfully applied to host the Eurovision Song Contest 2022 held in Italy.

Concerts
Over the years, the venue has hosted concerts by artists such as Zucchero Fornaciari, Emma Marrone, Ligabue, Alessandra Amoroso, Deep Purple, Jovanotti, Antonello Venditti, Claudio Baglioni, Renato Zero, Laura Pausini, Biagio Antonacci, Vasco Rossi, 50 Cent, Elisa, Giorgia, Ghali, Maluma, Thegiornalisti, Caparezza, Calcutta, Negramaro, Modà, Ultimo, Piero Pelù and Iron Maiden.

See also
 Stadio Tupparello
 List of indoor arenas in Italy

References

Indoor arenas in Italy
Basketball venues in Italy
1993 establishments in Italy
Sports venues completed in 1993